Anacrabro ocellatus is a species of square-headed wasp in the family Crabronidae. It is found in Central America and North America.

Subspecies
These three subspecies belong to the species Anacrabro ocellatus:
 Anacrabro ocellatus boerhaviae Cockerell, 1895
 Anacrabro ocellatus micheneri Leclercq, 1973
 Anacrabro ocellatus ocellatus Packard, 1866

References

Crabronidae
Articles created by Qbugbot
Insects described in 1866